Hajjiabad (also Romanized as Ḩājjīābād and Hājīābād) is a village in Baraan-e Jonubi Rural District, in the Central District of Isfahan County, Isfahan Province, Iran. At the 2006 census, its population was 11, in 5 families.

References 

Populated places in Isfahan County